Pernink is a municipality and village in Karlovy Vary District in the Karlovy Vary Region of the Czech Republic. It has about 600 inhabitants.

Administrative parts
Hamlets of Bludná and Rybná are administrative parts of Pernink.

Geography
Pernink is located in the Ore Mountains. The village is situated in the valley of the Bílá Bystřice stream.

History

At the beginning of the 16th century, mining pioneers settled in the area which was dominated by dense forest at the time. According to legend, a bear found ore here. The legend is preserved in the coat of arms and also in the German name (Bär = bear). In 1532, a settlement called Peringer was promoted to a mining town by the then owner of the estate, Jindřich Schlick. The town received further privileges in 1559 and 1562.

The predominant industry was the mining of silver and tin. The area between Pernink, Abertamy and Horní Blatná used to be called "silver triangle". Following the Thirty Years' War, most of the Protestant miners left to neighbouring Saxony. Mining was gradually replaced by forestry and crafts.

In the first half of the 19th century, Adalbert Meinl founded a textile factory. Small workshops for the manufacturing of wooden and iron products were established. In 1843, the town had almost 1,800 residents living in 207 houses. The economic situation was bolstered by the opening of the railway in 1899. In the inter-war period, the number of residents rose to approximately 3,500.

From 1938 to 1945 it was annexed by Nazi Germany and administered as partof the Reichsgau Sudetenland. After the World War II, almost 90% if the inhabitants were expelled. The area was resettled with hundreds of new Czech settlers in 1946. Following the closure of uranium mines in Jáchymov, the number of residents decreased.

Economy
Today, Pernink lives mainly from tourism. The municipality is a centre of winter and summer sports.

Transport
Pernink is located on the Karlovy Vary–Johanngeorgenstadt railway. The local railway station is with an elevation of  the second highest in the Czech Republic.

Sights

The Church of the Holy Trinity was built in 1714–1716. It has a tower in Alpine style.

The viaduct in Pernink is at the highest altitude in the country. It is a significant technical monument.

The former Bludná mining district is a part of Ore Mountain Mining Region, protected as a UNESCO World Heritage Site.

Notable people
Rudolf Kippenhahn (1926–2020), German astrophysicist
Rudolf Höhnl (born 1946), ski jumper

References

External links

 

Villages in Karlovy Vary District
Villages in the Ore Mountains